Barbro Lindgren (born 18 March 1937) is a Swedish writer of children's books and books for adult readers. For her lasting contribution as a children's writer, Lindgren was a finalist for the biennial, international Hans Christian Andersen Award in 2004. Ten years later she won the annual Astrid Lindgren Memorial Award. The biggest cash prize in children's and young-adult literature, it rewards a writer, illustrator, oral storyteller, or reading promoter for its entire body of work.

Life 
Barbro Enskog was born in Bromma, Stockholm. She graduated from art school in 1958 and has been writing books for publication since 1965. Her style has exerted a major influence on  Swedish children's literature. Located between realism and surrealism, her works are humorous and imaginative, and her books for children treat important issues to be taken seriously and treated for children.

Early in her career Barbro Lindgren won the 1973 Astrid Lindgren Prize, an annual Swedish literary award distinct from the Astrid Lindgren Memorial Award. The once-in-a-lifetime award established on Astrid Lindgren's 60th birthday honours good writing for children or youth. Barbro Lindgren's long-time collaborator, the illustrator Eva Eriksson (born 1949), won the prize in 2001.

Awards 

 Astrid Lindgren Prize, 1973
 Samfundet De Nio's Astrid Lindgren Prize, 2004
 Illis quorum, 2009
 Astrid Lindgren Memorial Award, 2014
 H. M. The King's Medal, 2020

Selected books
 1965 - Mattias sommar (English: Mattias' Summer), self-illustrated, her first published book
 1967 - Hej hej Mattias
 1967 - Genom ventilerna
 1966 - Mera om Mattias
 1968 - I Västan Grind
 1969 - Loranga, Masarin och Dartanjang, self-illustrated
 1970 - Felipe
 1970 - Loranga. Loranga
 1970 - Nu har Kalle fått en lillasyster
 1971 - Goda' Goda'
 1971 - Nu är vi gorillor låssas vi
 1971 - Jättehemligt (English: Big Secret), first of an "autobiographical series of books in diary form"
 1972 - Världshemligt (English: Top Secret), sequel to Jättehemligt
 1972 - Alban
 1972 - Eldvin
 1973 - Bladen brinner (English: Pages on Fire), sequel to Jättehemligt
 1974 - Gröngölingen är på väg
 1975 - Molnens bröder
 1975 - Barbros pjäser för barn och andra
 1976 - Rapport från marken
 1976 - Lilla sparvel
 1976 - Vad tycker du?
 1977 - Stora sparvel
 1978 - Garderobsbio
 1978 - Hemliga lådans hemligheter
 1978 - Kom ner från trädet
 1978 - Världens längsta korv
 1978 - Var är mina byxor
 1978 - Jag har en tam myra
 1979 - Bara Sparvel
 1979 - Det riktiga havet
 1979 - Sagan om den lilla farbrorn (English: The Story of the Little Old Man), illustrated by Eva Eriksson
 1980 - Nils Pantaloni Penell
 1980 - Mamman och den vilda bebin (English: The Wild Baby, 1981), illus. Eriksson
 1981 - Max nalle, picture book illustrated by Eriksson, first in the little Max series or Sam series
 1981 - Max bil 
 1981 - Max kaka 
 1982 - Pompe badar i en å
 1982 - Pompe går i skogen, illus. Eriksson 
 1983 - Pompe tar en promenad
 1984 - Prinsessan på ärten
 1984 - Den fula ankungen
 1983 - OBS! Viktigt
 1982 - En liten cyklist
 1982 - Max lampa 
 1982 - Max balja 
 1982 - Max boll 
 1982 - Den vilda bebiresan (English translation The wild baby's boat trip, 1983)
 1985 - Sakta, sakta ... men ändå framåt
 1987 - Vems lilla mössa flyger? (English: Whose Little Hat is Flying?), chapter book
 1987 - Pellerell
 1986 - Vitkind
 1985 - Sagan om Karlknut
 1986 - Max potta 
 1986 - Max dockvagn 
 1985 - Hunden med rocken
 1985 - Vilda bebin får en hund (English: The Wild Baby's Dog, 1986)
 1988 - Nu är du mitt barn
 1989 - Sunkan flyger, with Olof Landström
 1988 - Hemligheter
 1990 - Den vilda bebiresan
 1990 - Korken flyger (English: The Cork is Flying), chapter book
 1990 - Stackars Allan
 1991 - Titta Max grav! 
 1991 - Pojken och stjärnan, with Anna-Clara Tidholm
 1992 - Bra Börje
 1992 - Boken om Sparvel
 1992 - Restaurangen är stängd
 1992 - Stora syster, Lille bror
 1993 - Jag säger bara Elitchoklad
 1993 - Puss puss sant sant
 1994 - Max blöja 
 1994 - Max napp 
 1994 - Här är det lilla huset
 1995 - Svempa vill ha många nappar
 1995 - Lilla lokomotivet Rosa
 1995 - Kungsholmen ros
 1996 - Rosa flyttar till stan
 1997 - Rosa på bal
 1997 - Nu är vi gorillor låssas vi
 1998 - Per och Pompe
 1998 - Nämen Benny
 1997 - Nu är vi jobbarkaniner
 1997 - Andrejs längtan
 1997 - Mössan och korken flyger
 1998 - Nämen Benny
 1999 - Prinsessan Rosa
 1999 - Rosa på dagis
 2000 - Vi leker att du är en humla
 2001 - Jamen Benny
 2004 - Boken om Benny
 2006 - Vad lever man för (English: What-Are-We-Living-For), chapter book
 2007 - Nöff nöff Benny
 2009 - Om sorgen och den lilla glädjen
 2011 - Ingenting hände, två gånger
 2013 - Ett nollsummespel
 2016 - Om fällor och flockdjur

Books in English 

 2015 – Max's Bath, Gecko Press, 
 2015 – Max's Bear, Gecko Press, 
 2015 – Max's Wagon, Gecko Press, 
 2017 – Soda Pop, Gecko Press,

Notes

References

External links

  (including 8 "from old catalog", 1965 to 1971)

1937 births
Living people
Astrid Lindgren Memorial Award winners
Swedish women children's writers
Swedish children's writers
Selma Lagerlöf Prize winners
Writers from Stockholm
Recipients of the Illis quorum